Rock Springs Run State Reserve is a  State Park in the U.S. state of Florida. The park contains a number of Indian mounds, pine flatwoods, swamps and artesian springs, and a number of creeks and rivers. Among them are Seminole Creek, Wekiwa Springs Run, Rock Springs Run, and the Wekiva River.

Activities include bicycling, hiking, canoeing, kayaking, horseback riding, hunting and wildlife viewing. Among the wildlife of the park are Florida black bear, Florida scrub jay, sandhill crane, indigo snake, gopher tortoise. The park is open from 8:00 a.m. till 6:00 p.m. year round.

Designated Paddling Trail

Rock Springs Run is part of Florida's Wekiva River/Rock Springs Run Designated Paddling Trail. The 9 mile Rock Springs Run starts at Kings Landing in Apopka, runs through Rock Springs Run State Preserve, and meets the Wekiva River about a half mile downstream from Wekiwa Springs State Park.

Gallery

External links

 Rock Springs Run State Reserve at Florida State Parks
 Rock Springs Run State Reserve at Absolutely Florida
 Rock Springs Run State Reserve at Wildernet
 Florida Greenways and Trails, Wekiva River/Rock Springs Run Designated Paddling Trail
 Rock Springs Run at PaddleFlorida.net

Parks in Lake County, Florida
State parks of Florida